Since the first Tour de France in 1903, there have been 2,205 stages, up to and including the final stage of the 2021 Tour de France. Since 1919, the race leader following each stage has been awarded the yellow jersey.

Although the leader of the classification after a stage gets a yellow jersey, he is not considered the winner of the yellow jersey, only the wearer. Only after the final stage, the wearer of the yellow jersey is considered the winner of the yellow jersey, and thereby the winner of the Tour de France.

In this article first-place-classifications before 1919 are also counted as if a yellow jersey was awarded. There have been more yellow jerseys given than there were stages: In 1914, 1929, and 1931, there were multiple cyclists with the same leading time, and the 1988 Tour de France had a "prelude", an extra stage for a select group of cyclists. As of 2021 a total of 2,208 yellow jerseys have been awarded in the Tour de France to 295 different riders.

Individual records

In previous tours, sometimes a stage was broken in two (or three). On such occasions, only the cyclist leading at the end of the day is counted. The "Jerseys" column lists the number of days that the cyclist wore the yellow jersey; the "Tour wins" column gives the number of times the cyclist won the general classification. The next four columns indicate the number of times the rider won the points classification, the King of the Mountains classification, and the young rider competition, and the years in which the yellow jersey was worn, with bold years indicating an overall Tour win. For example: Eddy Merckx has spent 96 days in the yellow jersey, won the general classification five times, won the points classification three times, and won the mountains classification twice, but never won the young rider classification. He wore the yellow jersey in the Tours of 1969, 1970, 1971, 1972, 1974 (which he all won) and 1975 (which he did not win). Three cyclists (Jean Robic in 1947, Charly Gaul in 1958 and Jan Janssen in 1968) have won the Tour de France with only two yellow jerseys in their career.

Until the results of Lance Armstrong were annulled for cheating in 2012, he was ranked second in this list, leading the Tour for 83 stages from 1999 to 2005. Alberto Contador was stripped of the yellow jersey and 6 days of wearing it in 2010 Tour de France because he tested positive for doping.

Fabian Cancellara is, as of 2022, the rider with the most yellow jerseys for someone who has not won the Tour with twenty-nine days in yellow.

This table is updated to the final stage of the 2022 Tour de France (i.e. the stage is included).

Number of wearers per year 

The largest number of different riders wearing the yellow jersey in any year is 8. The smallest is 1.

Notes

Per country
The yellow jersey has been awarded to 25 different countries since 1903. In the table below, "Jerseys" indicates the number of yellow jerseys that were given to cyclists of each country. "Tour wins" stands for the number of tour wins by cyclists of that country, "Points" for the number of times the points classification was won by cyclist of that country, "Mountains" for the number of times the mountains classification in the Tour de France was won by a cyclist of that country, and "Young rider" for the number of times the young rider classification was won by a cyclist of that country.
The "Most recent holder" column shows the cyclist of the country that wore the yellow jersey most recently. The "Different holders" column gives the number of different cyclists of the country that wore the yellow jersey.

Yellow jersey retirees
There have been sixteen instances where a rider quit the Tour for any reason while wearing the yellow jersey.

Yellow jersey winners with no stage wins

Usually the winner of the Tour de France also wins at least one stage, but that is not necessary. It is possible to win the Tour de France without winning a single stage, because the overall winner of the Tour de France is decided solely by the total race time. This has happened eight times so far:
   1922
   1956
   1960
   1966
   1990
  2006 
  2017
  2019

Of these eight cyclists, Walkowiak and Bernal are the only ones never to win a Tour stage at all, although Bernal is still active as of 2022, and was leading solo in the final stages of a stage abandoned due to a landslide on the final kilometres of the course in 2019, the year he won the Tour. Firmin Lambot won stages in the 1913, 1914, 1919, 1920 and 1921 Tours, Gastone Nencini won stages in the 1956, 1957 and 1958 Tours, Aimar won a stage in the 1967 Tour, LeMond won stages in the 1985, 1986 and 1989 Tours, Pereiro won a stage in the 2005 Tour, and Froome won stages in the 2012, 2013, 2015 and 2016 Tours. Alberto Contador initially also belonged to this group, when he won the 2010 Tour de France; however, he was later stripped of this title.

Number of Tour winners in a single race
Every Tour de France only has one winner. But a cyclist that has won the Tour de France previously can enter the race again, and a cyclist not winning the race can win the race in a later year. In almost every Tour de France, there were multiple 'former or future' Tour de France-winners in the race.
Only seven times, the Tour started without any former Tour de France winner. This happened in 1903, 1927, 1947, 1956, 1966, 1999 and 2006. Only in 1903, apart from the cyclist that won the race, was there no other former or future Tour de France winner.

In 1914, a record of seven former Tour de France winners started that year's Tour:
 (1905 winner)
 (1907 and 1908 winner)
 (1909 winner)
 (1910 winner)
 (1911 winner)
 (1912 winner)
 (1913 winner, who would also win the 1914 and the 1920 editions)
In addition to these seven cyclists, four cyclists in that year's Tour would go on to win a Tour later:
 (1919 and 1922 winner)
 (1921 winner)
 (1923 winner)
 (1926 winner)

Winning Tour de France on first occasion
Twelve cyclists won the general classification the first time they entered the competition, including three of the five-time champions.
1903 –  in the first ever Tour de France
1904 – 
1905 – 
1947 – , first Tour after World War II
1949 – , first of his 2 victories
1951 – 
1957 – , first of his 5 victories
1965 – 
1969 – , first of his 5 victories
1978 – , first of his 5 victories
1983 – , first of his 2 victories
2020 – , first of his 2 victories

Finishing Tour de France career with victory
Five cyclists won the Tour de France the last time they entered the competition:
1906 – , died before next race
1937 – 
1939 – , last Tour before World War II
1952 – 
2012 – 

Fausto Coppi is the only cyclist who won the Tour de France in both the first and the last Tour he entered.

See also
 List of Australian cyclists who have led the Tour de France general classification
 List of Belgian cyclists who have led the Tour de France general classification
 List of British cyclists who have led the Tour de France general classification
 List of Dutch cyclists who have led the Tour de France general classification

References

External links
Tour de France database: Official Tour de France history

Tour de France classifications and awards
Cycling records and statistics